Leporiconus is a subgenus  of sea snails, marine gastropod mollusks in the genus Conus, family Conidae, the cone snails and their allies.

In the latest classification of the family Conidae by Puillandre N., Duda T.F., Meyer C., Olivera B.M. & Bouchet P. (2015), Leporiconus has become a subgenus of Conus as Conus (Leporiconus) Iredale, 1930(type species:  Conus glans Hwass in Bruguière, 1792) represented as Conus Linnaeus, 1758

Distinguishing characteristics
The Tucker & Tenorio 2009 taxonomy distinguishes Leporiconus from Conus in the following ways:

 Genus Conus sensu stricto Linnaeus, 1758
 Shell characters (living and fossil species)
The basic shell shape is conical to elongated conical, has a deep anal notch on the shoulder, a smooth periostracum and a small operculum. The shoulder of the shell is usually nodulose and the protoconch is usually multispiral. Markings often include the presence of tents except for black or white color variants, with the absence of spiral lines of minute tents and textile bars.
Radular tooth (not known for fossil species)
The radula has an elongated anterior section with serrations and a large exposed terminating cusp, a non-obvious waist, blade is either small or absent and has a short barb, and lacks a basal spur.
Geographical distribution
These species are found in the Indo-Pacific region.
Feeding habits
These species eat other gastropods including cones.

 Subgenus Leporiconus Iredale, 1930
Shell characters (living and fossil species)
The shell is subcylindrical to pyriform in shape (like a torpedo) with rounded to indistinct shoulders.  The protoconch is multispiral.  The shell is ornamented with two or more cords on the whorl tops, nodules which die out in the early whorls, and well developed and pustulose ridges on the body whorl.  The anal notch is shallow.  The anterior end of the shell is usually colored blue, purple or pink.  The periostracum is smooth, and the operculum is small.
Radular tooth (not known for fossil species)
The anterior section of the radular tooth is roughly equal to the length of posterior section, and blade is long and is at least one-half the length of the anterior section.  A basal spur is present, and the barb is short.  The radular tooth has serrations, and a terminating cusp.
Geographical distribution
The species in this genus occur in the occur in the Indo-Pacific region.
Feeding habits
These cone snails are vermivorous, meaning that the cones prey on polychaete and eunicid worms.

Species list
This list of species is based on the information in the World Register of Marine Species (WoRMS) list. Species within the genus Leporiconus include:

 Leporiconus coffeae (Gmelin, 1791): synonym of  Conus coffeae Gmelin, 1791
 Leporiconus corallinus (Kiener, 1845): synonym of  Conus corallinus Kiener, 1845
 Leporiconus cylindraceus (Broderip & G.B. Sowerby I, 1830): synonym of  Conus cylindraceus Broderip & G. B. Sowerby I, 1830
 Leporiconus glans (Hwass in Bruguière, 1792): synonym of  Conus glans Hwass in Bruguière, 1792
 Leporiconus granum (Röckel & Fischöder, 1985): synonym of  Conus granum Röckel & Fischöder, 1985
 Leporiconus luteus (G.B. Sowerby I, 1833): synonym of  Conus luteus G. B. Sowerby I, 1833
 Leporiconus mitratus (Hwass in Bruguière, 1792): synonym of  Conus mitratus Hwass in Bruguière, 1792
 Leporiconus nucleus (Reeve, 1848): synonym of  Conus nucleus Reeve, 1848
 Leporiconus tenuistriatus (G.B. Sowerby II, 1858): synonym of  Conus tenuistriatus G. B. Sowerby II, 1858

References

Further reading 
 Kohn A. A. (1992). Chronological Taxonomy of Conus, 1758-1840". Smithsonian Institution Press, Washington and London.
 Monteiro A. (ed.) (2007). The Cone Collector 1: 1-28.
 Berschauer D. (2010). Technology and the Fall of the Mono-Generic Family The Cone Collector 15: pp. 51-54
 Puillandre N., Meyer C.P., Bouchet P., and Olivera B.M. (2011), Genetic divergence and geographical variation in the deep-water Conus orbignyi complex (Mollusca: Conoidea)'', Zoologica Scripta 40(4) 350-363.

External links
 To World Register of Marine Species
  Gastropods.com: Conidae setting forth the genera recognized therein.

Conidae
Gastropod subgenera